Silas is a common given name and a lesser-known surname. It is a cognate of Silvanus.

Etymology
The name comes from the early Christian disciple Silas. He is consistently called "Silas" in Acts, but the Latin Silvanus, which means "of the forest," is always used by Paul and in the First Epistle of Peter; it is likely that "Silvanus" is the Romanized version of the original "Silas," or that "Silas" is the Greek nickname for "Silvanus." It has been suggested that Silas is the Greek version of the Aramaic "Seila," a version of the Hebrew "Saul". The Latin name "Silvanus" may be derived from pre-Roman Italian languages.

Variants
 Danish – Silas
 Dutch – Silas
 English – Silas, Sylas, Si, Sy
 French – Sylvain
 German – Silas, Silvan
 Italian – Silvano

People

Given name
 Silas, a 1st-century leading figure among the early Christian community in Jerusalem
 Silas (Portuguese footballer) (born 1976), real name Jorge Fernandes
 Silas Tertius Rand Bill (1842–1890), Canadian politician
 Silas Chou (born 1946), Hong Kong billionaire
 Silas Farley, American ballet dancer, choreographer and educator
 Silas Feitosa José De Souza (born 1985), Brazilian footballer
 Silas Deane (1738–1789), colonial American politician and diplomat
 Silas G. Harris ( 1818–1851), American politician
 Silas M. Holmes (1816–1905), American politician
 Silas House (born 1971), American author
 Silas Melson (born 1996), American basketball player 
 Silas Weir Mitchell (disambiguation), multiple people
 Silas Katompa Mvumpa (born 1998), DR Congolese footballer
 Silas Parsons (c. 1800–1860), justice of the Supreme Court of Alabama
 Silas Wright Porter (1857–1937), American judge
 Silas Soule (1838–1865), American abolitionist
 Silas A. Wade (1797–1869), American politician
 Silas, pen name of cartoonist Winsor McCay when working on the comic strip Dream of the Rarebit Fiend'

Surname
 Mar Shila (Silas) (fl. 503–520), Catholicos Patriarch of the Church of the East
 James Silas (born 1949), American basketball player
 Paul Silas (1943–2022), American professional basketball player and coach
 Paulo Silas (born 1965), Brazilian footballer
 Stephen Silas (born 1973), American professional basketball coach (Paul Silas' son)
 Xavier Silas (born 1988), American basketball player

Fictional characters
Silas Adams, the intelligent, laconic henchman of Al Swearengen in the HBO series Deadwood King Silas Benjamin, played by Ian McShane from the American television series Kings Silas Blissett, in British TV soap Hollyoaks, played by Jeff Rawle
 Silas Dengdamor from season two of the BBC America television series Dirk Gently's Holistic Detective Agency
 Silas Botwin, in the Showtime series Weeds Silas Briarwood, from the D&D livestream Critical Role
 Silas Crow (Ermineskin), in the movie Dance Me Outside based on the book of short stories of the same title by W.P. Kinsella
 Silas Greaves, bounty hunter and protagonist of Call of Juarez: Gunslinger Silas Greenback, primary antagonist in the British TV series Danger Mouse Silas Heap, in the Septimus Heap series by Angie Sage
 Silas Lynch, in 1915 film The Birth of a Nation, played by George Siegmann 
 The book and character Silas MarnerSilas Scratch, a fictional character and rumor from the children's novel Diary of a Wimpy Kid Silas P. Silas, played by Method Man in the stoner comedy How High Silas Stone, in DC comics
 Silas Thatcher, a supporting antagonist in the 2012 video game Assassin's Creed III Silas Vorez, antagonist in the video game The Quarry (video game) Silas Wegg, from Our Mutual Friend by Charles Dickens
 Silas and the Winterbottoms, a novel by Stephen M. Giles
 Silas, portrayed by Nicholas Hoult in the 2015 film Equals Sylas, a playable character from the Fire Emblem game series
 Silas, in American TV series The Walking Dead: World Beyond Silas, in the Brazilian Netflix series 3% Silas, in the novel The Da Vinci Code Silas, in the novel The Graveyard Book Silas, from the novels of Cecil Bødker, also adapted into a German TV series for ZDF in 1981
 Silas, in American TV series The Vampire Diaries Silas, (A.K.A. Colonel Leland Bishop), one of the antagonists from Transformers: Prime The novel and character Uncle Silas''
Silas Ramsbottom, character in Despicable Me 2

References